Luboradz may refer to the following places in Poland:
Luboradz, Lower Silesian Voivodeship (south-west Poland)
Luboradz, Łódź Voivodeship (central Poland)
Luboradz, West Pomeranian Voivodeship (north-west Poland)